The Jodrell Bank Centre for Astrophysics at the University of Manchester, is among the largest astrophysics groups in the UK. It includes the Jodrell Bank Observatory, the MERLIN/VLBI National Facility, and the Jodrell Bank Visitor Centre.  The centre was formed after the merger of the Victoria University of Manchester and UMIST which brought two astronomy groups together. The Jodrell Bank site also hosts the headquarters of the SKA Observatory (SKAO) - the International Governmental Organisation (IGO)  tasked with the delivery and operation of the Square Kilometre Array, created on the signing of the Rome Convention in 2019. The SKA will be the largest telescope in the world - construction is expected to start at the end of this decade.

The JBCA is part of the School of Physics and Astronomy. The current director is Professor Michael Garrett.

Research 
The research at the Centre focuses on:
 Astrochemistry
 Astrophysical masers
 The Cosmic Microwave Background
 Galaxy formation and evolution
 Gravitational lenses
 Theoretical astrophysics and cosmology
 Planetary nebulae
 Pulsars
 Stellar physics (including star formation and solar plasmas)
 Development of telescope receivers

Jodrell Bank Observatory 

The Jodrell Bank Observatory, located near Goostrey and Holmes Chapel in Cheshire, has played an important role in the research of meteors, quasars, pulsars, masers and gravitational lenses, and was heavily involved with the tracking of space probes at the start of the Space Age.

The main telescope at the observatory is the Lovell Telescope, which is the third largest steerable radio telescope in the world. There are three other active telescopes located at the observatory; the Mark II, as well as 42 ft and 7m-diameter radio telescopes. Jodrell Bank Observatory is also the base of the Multi-Element Radio Linked Interferometer Network (MERLIN), a National Facility run by the University of Manchester on behalf of the Science and Technology Facilities Council.

References

External links
 

Jodrell Bank Observatory
Astronomy institutes and departments
Square Kilometre Array
Departments of the University of Manchester